The Yukon Arctic Ultra is a series of non-stop multiday races that take place concurrently beginning in Whitehorse, Yukon at the beginning of February each year. The marathon, 100/300/430 mile races follow the course of the Yukon Quest. The longer races have three disciplines: mountain bike, xc-skis or foot.
The race is billed as the toughest ultramarathon in the world where the temperatures can drop to -50 degrees plus wind chill. The race was founded in 2003 and has run every year since except 2010.

The race is self-provisioned.  While the organizers provide trail guides, there is a real risk of frostbite and amputations.

See also
 List of ultramarathons

References

Further reading
Mark Hines (2010) The Yukon Arctic Ultra: Ultra Marathon Adventure Racing Across Canada's Frozen North Healthy Body Publishing (Paperback)

External links
Yukon Arctic Ultra

Ultramarathons
Sports competitions in Yukon
2003 establishments in Canada
Recurring sporting events established in 2003